Murga (or Murgaš, Murgë) is a peak found in Kosovo in the Šar Mountains .

Notes and references

Notes:

References:

Mountains of Kosovo
Šar Mountains
Two-thousanders of Kosovo